Christopher Hemsworth  (born 11 August 1983) is an Australian actor. He rose to prominence playing Kim Hyde in the Australian television series Home and Away (2004–2007) before beginning a film career in Hollywood. In the Marvel Cinematic Universe (MCU), Hemsworth started playing Thor with the 2011 film of the same name and most recently reprised the role in Thor: Love and Thunder (2022), which established him among the world's highest-paid actors.

His other film roles include the action films Star Trek (2009), Snow White and the Huntsman (2012), Red Dawn (2012), Blackhat (2015), Men in Black: International (2019), Extraction (2020), the thriller A Perfect Getaway (2009) and the comedy Ghostbusters (2016). Hemsworth's most critically acclaimed films include the comedy horror The Cabin in the Woods (2012) and the biographical sports film Rush (2013) in which he portrayed James Hunt.

Early life
Christopher Hemsworth was born on 11 August 1983 in Melbourne, to Leonie (née van Os), an English teacher, and Craig Hemsworth, a social-services counsellor. He is the second of three sons, following Luke (born 1980) and preceding Liam (born 1990); both of them are also actors. His maternal grandfather is a Dutch immigrant and his maternal grandmother is of Irish descent; on his paternal line he is of English, Scottish, and German ancestry. He was brought up both in Melbourne and in the Outback in Bulman, Northern Territory. He has said, "My earliest memories were on the cattle stations up in the Outback, and then we moved back to Melbourne and then back out there and then back again. Certainly most of my childhood was in Melbourne but probably my most vivid memories were up there [in Bulman] with crocodiles and buffalo. Very different walks of life." He attended high school at Heathmont College before his family again returned to the Northern Territory, and then moved a few years later to Phillip Island.

Career

Early work (2002–2010)
Hemsworth started his career by appearing in several television series. In 2002, Hemsworth starred in two episodes of fantasy television series Guinevere Jones as King Arthur, as well as making an appearance in soap opera series Neighbours and one episode of Marshall Law. The following year, he appeared in an episode of The Saddle Club. In 2004, Hemsworth auditioned for the role of Robbie Hunter in Australian soap opera Home and Away. He did not receive the part, but was subsequently recalled for the part of Kim Hyde. He moved to Sydney to join the cast, appearing in 171 episodes of the series. He left the cast of Home and Away on 3 July 2007. Hemsworth later remarked that although he became more visible after Home and Away, his work on a soap opera did not earn him respect within the film industry.

Hemsworth was a contestant on the fifth season of Dancing with the Stars Australia, partnered with professional dancer Abbey Ross. The season premiered on 26 September 2006, and after six weeks, Hemsworth was eliminated on 7 November. Hemsworth's appearance in the franchise would almost cost him the role of Thor, as producers of the Marvel film franchise feared fans would be put off.

In 2009, Hemsworth played James T. Kirk's father, George Kirk, in the opening scenes of J. J. Abrams' film Star Trek. The role was initially offered to Matt Damon, who turned it down; Abrams appreciated Hemsworth taking on the role. Josh Tyler of Cinema Blend was impressed with Hemsworth, describing the actor's scene as the "best five minutes I've spent in a movie theater this year." The film was a box office success, grossing US$385.7 million. That same year, Hemsworth played the character Kale Garrity in the thriller A Perfect Getaway. It was a modest success, grossing US$22 million against a US$14 million budget, and received mixed reviews, but Hemsworth was praised for his "appropriately intimidating" performance of a "thuggish backpacker." Paul Young of Screen Rant also praised Hemsworth's performance as "solid."

Hemsworth went on to play Sam in 2010's Ca$h alongside English actor Sean Bean, which was the first film he shot when he arrived in the United States. The film's director, Stephen Milburn Anderson, said Hemsworth had only been in the United States for six weeks when he had auditioned for the role, recalling, "Here's a guy who is young, has the right look, is a very good actor and, let's face it, he's beautiful. So I say, we need to get this guy in. I was very impressed". In November 2010, The Hollywood Reporter named Hemsworth one of the young male actors who are "pushing – or being pushed" onto the Hollywood "A-List".

Thor and worldwide recognition (2011–2015)
In 2011, Sony Pictures announced that Hemsworth would star in the thriller Shadow Runner, but the film has yet to go into production. That same year, Hemsworth was cast as the superhero Thor in the Marvel Cinematic Universe. His first film in the franchise was 2011's Thor. He and castmate Tom Hiddleston, who ultimately played Loki, had each auditioned for the role, for which Hemsworth said he gained 20 pounds of muscle. With a worldwide gross of US$449.3 million, Thor was the 15th highest-grossing film of 2011. The film received positive reviews, and Hemsworth's portrayal of the God of Thunder was praised by Kenneth Turan of the Los Angeles Times. Hemsworth reprised the role the following year for the film The Avengers (2012) as one of the six superheroesalongside Robert Downey Jr.'s Tony Stark / Iron Man, Chris Evans' Steve Rogers / Captain America, Mark Ruffalo's Bruce Banner / Hulk, Scarlett Johansson's Natasha Romanova / Black Widow, and Jeremy Renner's Clint Barton / Hawkeyesent to defend Earth from his adopted brother, Loki. The film was a critical and commercial success, grossing over US$1.5 billion worldwide. The ensemble cast was praised for their onscreen chemistry by Peter Travers of Rolling Stone.

Hemsworth shot the horror film The Cabin in the Woods shortly after the release of Star Trek, but it went unreleased until 2012. It garnered positive reviews, and his portrayal of Alpha male jock Curt Vaughan was described by Alison Foreman of Mashable as his "sexiest" role yet. Hemsworth later starred opposite Kristen Stewart in the film Snow White and the Huntsman (2012) as the Huntsman. Although a commercial success, grossing US$396 million worldwide, it received mixed reviews. Critics were critical of Hemsworth and Stewart's onscreen chemistry, and Angela Watercutter of Wired felt the characters were "not fully fleshed-out." Hemsworth was cast as Jed Eckert in the 2012 Red Dawn remake after MGM saw dailies footage of a scene from The Cabin in the Woods; he was cast as Thor two days after being cast in Red Dawn. The film was a box-office bomb, grossing only US$50 million against a production budget of US$65 million, and received negative reviews.

In 2013, Hemsworth starred in Ron Howard's sports drama film Rush, as  Formula 1 World Champion James Hunt. The film was critically praised and became a box office success, grossing US$98.2 million against a budget of US$38 million. Henry Barnes of The Guardian was impressed with Hemsworth's performance, praising the actor for delivering the "superb script" with "some mastery." Later that year, Hemsworth reprised the role of Thor for the sequel to Thor in Thor: The Dark World (2013). Although a commercial success with a worldwide gross of US$644.6 million, the film became the lowest-rated film in the MCU franchise on the review aggregator website Rotten Tomatoes at 66% approval rating. The chemistry between Hemsworth and Hiddleston was praised by critics; Ben Child of The Guardian wrote, "Thanks to Hiddleston and Hemsworth's impressive collective charisma, Thor: The Dark World is far from a franchise killer."

In 2015, Hemsworth starred in director Michael Mann's action thriller Blackhat, opposite Viola Davis. The film bombed at the box office and was poorly received. For many critics, a significant issue of the film was the casting of Hemsworth as a hacker; Christy Lemire of the Chicago Sun-Times remarked, "Anyone who makes [their] way in the world sitting in front of a computer screen all day is not going to look as hunky as Hemsworth." Hemsworth himself later admitted to being displeased with his performance: "I didn't enjoy what I did in the film," he commented. "It just felt flat, and it was also an attempt to do what I thought people might have wanted to see. But I don't think I'm good in that space." He reprised his role as Thor for the fourth time in the sequel to The Avengers, Avengers: Age of Ultron. In addition to the film receiving positive reviews and grossing over US$1.4 billion worldwide, Hemsworth also won the People's Choice Awards for Favorite Action Movie Actor. Hemsworth returned to the set of Home and Away in November 2014 to film a scene as an extra and not as his character Kim Hyde. The episode which he appeared in was broadcast on 19 May 2015.

That same year, he co-starred in the comedy film Vacation, along with Ed Helms, a revival of the film series that originally starred Chevy Chase. He was nominated for the MTV Movie Awards for Best Kiss with Leslie Mann. His last 2015 film was In the Heart of the Sea, based on the book of the same name by Nathaniel Philbrick, with Hemsworth playing first mate Owen Chase. In an interview on Jimmy Kimmel Live!, he said that to prepare for the role of starving sailors, the cast was put on a diet of 500–600 calories a day to lose weight. In the Heart of the Sea received mixed reviews from critics, and was a box office disappointment, grossing US$93 million against a US$100 million budget, but Hemsworth received a nomination for Choice Movie Actor: Action at the 18th Teen Choice Awards.

Continued commercial success (2016–present)
In 2016, Hemsworth reprised the role of Eric the Huntsman in The Huntsman: Winter's War, alongside Jessica Chastain, who played his love interest. Writing for IndieWire, Oliver Lyttelton criticised the onscreen chemistry between Hemsworth and Chastain, stating that "they're both struggling uphill against accents they're palpably not comfortable with, displaying zero chemistry, and frankly appearing to be in different films." The film underperformed compared to its predecessor, grossing only US$165 million. Hemsworth later joined the cast of the reboot Ghostbusters film, playing Kevin the receptionist. The film disappointed critically and commercially, but Hemsworth was praised for "deliver[ing] the most fun" by Caroline Westbrook of Metro and won the Kids' Choice Awards for Favorite Movie Actor.

Hemsworth reprised his role as Thor in Thor: Ragnarok, released on 3 November 2017 in the U.S., and again in both the third and fourth Avengers films, Avengers: Infinity War and Avengers: Endgame in 2018 and 2019 respectively. All three films were a critical and commercial success. Matt Zoller Seitz of RogerEbert.com likened Hemsworth's acting to Cary Grant, stating that "Hemsworth's charisma holds [Thor: Ragnarok] together whenever it threatens to spin apart". Hemsworth won the Teen Choice Awards for Choice Sci-Fi Movie Actor. Meanwhile, in his review of Avengers: Endgame, Joe Morgenstern of The Wall Street Journal acknowledged "Hemsworth's Thor, endearing despite some ragged material and the actor's seemingly limited dramatic range" while praising Hemsworth in the MCU Infinity Saga finale "as the graceful, exuberant comic actor he was destined to be, while Thor morphs, alarmingly and charminglyyet still heroicallyinto a beer-bellied apparition who could pass for Jeff Lebowski."

In 2019, Hemsworth also starred in a spin-off of the Men in Black series, titled Men in Black: International. The film grossed US$253 million worldwide and received generally unfavourable reviews from critics, who criticised the "lackluster action and forgettable plot," although the chemistry between Hemsworth and co-star Tessa Thompson was praised. The following year, he starred in the Netflix action thriller Extraction, reuniting him with the Russo brothers, who served as producers. After being watched by 90 million households in its initial month of release, the film broke Netflix's viewership record previously held by Bird Box. In 2020, Hemsworth reprised the role of Thor in the fourth film, Thor: Love and Thunder. Filming began in February 2021 in Australia, and it was released on June 23, 2022.

Hemsworth has also been working on Limitless, a six-part documentary series, for National Geographic. The show has paired Hemsworth with noted filmmaker Darren Aronofsky. The show has Hemsworth appearing in a variety of different ways that humans have sought to increase their health in a variety of different ways. The episodes saw Hemsworth take a plunge in icy Arctic water, fast for long periods of time, and participate in an indigenous Australian ceremony. The last of which resulted in some controversy for the show, as Indigenous groups claimed that filming at the sacred site was disrespectful to the culture.

Upcoming projects
Hemsworth was to reprise his role as George Kirk in the fourth film of the rebooted Star Trek film series, but he left the project in August 2018 after contract negotiations fell through; Hemsworth later said he found the script underwhelming. On 13 October 2020, it was announced that Hemsworth will star in the Mad Max: Fury Road spin-off Furiosa. Hemsworth will return as Tyler Rake in Netflix's Extraction 2, a film that earned him $20 million.

Public image
After appearing as Thor in the MCU franchise, Hemsworth's physique gained attention from fans. His exercise routines have been regularly discussed in the media, including The Times of India, Men's Health, MensXP, Entertainment Tonight, and Metro. He later created the fitness app Centr, which provides paying customers access to nutrition, wellness, and exercise routines. In 2014, he was named the "Sexiest Man Alive" by People magazine.

Hemsworth is an avid supporter of the Western Bulldogs in the Australian Football League. He was the star of the AFL's 2014 Everything's Possible campaign, donating the fees for his involvement to the Australian Children Foundation. Hemsworth was also the star in the AFL's 2017 "I'd Like to See That" commercial.

Wealth
As his career in Hollywood films has developed, Hemsworth has become one of the world's highest-paid actors. He appeared in Forbes World's Highest Paid Actors list in 2014, 2015, and 2018. Additionally, he ranked 31st in the magazine's list of Highest Paid Celebrities in 2018 and 24th in 2019 with estimated earnings of US$76.4 million.

Charity
In May 2020, Chris and his brother Liam were among the celebrities who read an instalment of Roald Dahl's children's fantasy novel James and the Giant Peach in aid of the global-non profit charity Partners In Health, co-founded by Dahl's daughter Ophelia, which had been fighting COVID-19 in vulnerable areas.

Personal life
Hemsworth began dating Spanish model and actress Elsa Pataky in early 2010, after meeting through their mutual representatives. They married in December 2010. The couple have a daughter, India Rose, born in May 2012 and twin sons, Sasha and Tristan, born in March 2014. In 2015, the family moved from Los Angeles to Byron Bay, New South Wales, in his native Australia.

Hemsworth's children train Brazilian jiu-jitsu under Thalison Soares, and he has regularly taken them to compete in national tournaments.

Hemsworth was appointed a Member of the Order of Australia in the 2021 Queen's Birthday Honours.

In episode five of his National Geographic documentary Limitless (2022), Hemsworth revealed that his maternal grandfather suffers from Alzheimer's disease. It was also revealed that Hemsworth himself has inherited two copies of the APOE4 gene, one from his mother and one from his father, which makes it eight to ten times likelier for him to eventually develop Alzheimer's disease than the general population. As such, Hemsworth plans to take an indefinite break from acting to spend more time with his family.

Filmography

Film

Television

Video games

Awards and nominations

References

External links

1983 births
Living people
Members of the Order of Australia
21st-century Australian male actors
Australian expatriate male actors in the United States
Australian film producers
Australian male film actors
Australian male soap opera actors
Australian male video game actors
Australian male voice actors
Australian people of Dutch descent
Australian people of English descent
Australian people of German descent
Australian people of Irish descent
Australian people of Scottish descent
Chris
Logie Award winners
Male actors from Melbourne